Senator Saxton may refer to:

Charles T. Saxton (1846–1903), New York State Senate
Jim Saxton (born 1943), New Jersey State Senate